John Alfred Cooke (1878 – 10 August 1909) was an English footballer who played in the Football League for Derby County as an outside left.

Cooke made 11 appearances in the Football League First Division for Derby County, scoring twice. His debut was on 20 April 1899, at home to Nottingham Forest, and the remaining 10 matches came in the first half of the 1899–1900 season.

Cooke drowned on 10 August 1909 while swimming in a deep mill dam at Sutton-in-Ashfield, Nottinghamshire.

References

1878 births
1909 deaths
English footballers
Association football outside forwards
English Football League players
Mansfield Town F.C. players
Derby County F.C. players
Deaths by drowning in the United Kingdom